Manlius is a town in Onondaga County, east of the City of Syracuse, New York, United States. The population was 33,712 at the 2020 census, making it the third largest suburb in metropolitan Syracuse. In 2005, the town was ranked 98th on CNN's list of Best Places to Live.

The town of Manlius includes a village also named Manlius, along with the villages of Fayetteville and Minoa. It is located on the eastern border of Onondaga County.

History 

The town was a township of the former Central New York Military Tract. Manlius is the name of several important Romans, but exactly which one was being honored is no longer known. The current town was first settled around 1790.

The town of Manlius was created in 1794, along with Onondaga County, as a much larger entity, which was decreased by the formation, in part or in whole, of new towns (DeWitt, Onondaga, Salina) and part of Syracuse.

The economy related to trade generated by the Erie Canal contributed to the early development of the town.

The Christ Church and Manlius Village Cemeteries and Mycenae Schoolhouse are listed on the National Register of Historic Places.

Geography
The eastern town line is the border of Madison County, New York, marked in part by Chittenango Creek. The town of DeWitt is to the west,  the town of Pompey is to the south, and the town of Cicero is to the north.

According to the United States Census Bureau, the town has a total area of 50.0 square miles (129.4 km2), of which 49.6 square miles (128.5 km2) is land and 0.3 square mile (0.9 km2) (0.68%) is water.

The New York State Thruway (Interstate 90) crosses the northern part of Manlius. New York State Route 290 crosses the northwestern corner of the town. New York State Route 5 (in part, Genesee Turnpike) and New York State Route 173 (Seneca Turnpike) are east-west highways. New York State Route 257 is a north-south state highway, while New York State Route 92 (Cazenovia Rd) is a northwest-southeast highway.

Demographics

As of the census of 2000, there were 31,872 people, 12,553 households, and 8,887 families residing in the town.  The population density was 642.3 people per square mile (248.0/km2).  There were 13,071 housing units at an average density of 263.4 per square mile (101.7/km2).  The racial makeup of the town was 94.70% White, 0.87% Black or African American, 0.24% Native American, 2.94% Asian, 0.01% Pacific Islander, 0.17% from other races, and 1.07% from two or more races. Hispanic or Latino of any race were 0.97% of the population.

There were 12,553 households, out of which 34.5% had children under the age of 18 living with them, 60.2% were married couples living together, 8.0% had a female householder with no husband present, and 29.2% were non-families. 25.3% of all households were made up of individuals, and 10.9% had someone living alone who was 65 years of age or older. The average household size was 2.51 and the average family size was 3.04.

The population in the town was spread out, with 26.4% under the age of 18, 4.7% from 18 to 24, 26.7% from 25 to 44, 26.7% from 45 to 64, and 15.5% who were 65 years of age or older. The median age was 41 years. For every 100 females, there were 91.3 males. For every 100 females age 18 and over, there were 86.4 males.

The median income for a household in the town was $60,118, and the median income for a family was $70,655. As of the 2008 estimate, however, these figures had risen to $71,830 and $88,272, respectively. Males had a median income of $52,065 versus $31,486 for females. The per capita income for the town was $31,825, but had risen to $39,688 in 2008.  About 2.0% of families and 3.3% of the population were below the poverty line, including 3.5% of those under age 18 and 4.7% of those age 65 or over.

Education 
Fayetteville-Manlius Central School District, East Syracuse-Minoa Central School District, and Chittenango Central School District each serve sections of the Town of Manlius.

Before the school districts were formed, the historic Mycenae Schoolhouse was used.

The Fayetteville-Manlius Central School District has also been recognized by New York State for having a great educational system and has won many awards.

Elementary schools
 Enders Road Elementary School
 Fayetteville Elementary School
 Fremont Elementary School
 Minoa Elementary School
 Mott Road Elementary School
 Woodland Elementary School

Middle schools
 Eagle Hill Middle School
 Wellwood Middle School (formerly Fayetteville High School)
 Pine Grove Middle School

High school
 Fayetteville-Manlius High School
 East Syracuse-Minoa High School

Private secondary
The Manlius School, formerly St. John's Military School, merged with the Pebble Hill School in 1970 to become the Manlius Pebble Hill School. The school's Manlius campus was closed following the merger in 1974.

Communities and locations in the Town of Manlius 

 Eagle Village – A hamlet northeast of Manlius village on NY-173.
 Fayetteville – The Village of Fayetteville is by the western town line at the junction of NY-257 and NY-5.
 Fayetteville Towne Center –that was formerly Fayetteville Mall.
 Fillmore Corners – A hamlet west of Manlius village on NY-173.
 Fremont Heights — A suburban hamlet near the western town boundary, south of Minoa.
 Fremont Hills — A suburban hamlet near the western town line, south of Minoa.
Green Lake – A lake located northeast of Fayetteville.
Green Lakes State Park – A state park southeast of Minoa containing two unique lakes.
High Bridge — A hamlet at the west town line on NY-92.
 Kirkville — A hamlet east of Minoa.
Limestone Creek
 Manlius – The Village of Manlius is near the southern town line at the junction of NY-92 and NY-173.
 Manlius Center — A location south of Minoa and north of Fayetteville at the junction of NY-257 and NY-290.
 Minoa – The Village of Minoa is in the northern part of the town on NY-257.
 Mycenae – A hamlet near the eastern town line on NY-5.
 North Manlius — A hamlet by the northern town line and Chittenango Creek.
 Old Erie Canal State Historic Park
 Peck Hill – A hamlet by the eastern town line, east of Manlius village.
 Polkville – A location northwest of Minoa.
 Pompey – A hamlet in the western part of the town at US 20 and NY 91 (part of which is in Manlius).
 Saintsville — A hamlet in the northern part of the town, east of Minoa.
 Schepps Corner — A hamlet near the northern town line on NY-298.
 Snyders Crossing — A location between Minoa and Kirkville.

The three libraries located in the Town of Manlius—Village of Manlius Library, Fayetteville Free Library, and Village of Minoa Library—are branches of the Onondaga County Public Library.

Notable people 
The people below were born in or were residents of Manlius, New York
 Steve Altes, humorist and graphic novelist; co-recipient of the National Medal of Technology
 Laurie Halse Anderson, New York Times bestselling author and National Book Award finalist for the novel Speak
 William R. Gorsline, associate justice of the Colorado Territorial Supreme Court from 1866 to 1870
 Amos P. Granger, served as U.S. Congressman from 1855 to 1859
 Douglas Holtz-Eakin, former economics professor at Syracuse University and an adviser to the 2008 presidential campaign of John McCain
 Greg Paulus, former basketball player at Duke University and starting quarterback at Syracuse University
 John J. Peck, soldier who fought in the Mexican–American War and American Civil War
 Don Savage, former professional basketball player for the Syracuse Nationals
 Thomas S. Szasz, libertarian critic of psychiatry and author of The Myth of Mental Illness

See also

References

External links

 Town of Manlius official website
 |04000US36|05000US36067|06000US3606745029&_street=&_county=manlius&_cityTown=manlius&_state=04000US36&_zip=&_lang=en&_sse=on&ActiveGeoDiv=&_useEV=&pctxt=fph&pgsl=060&_submenuId=business_1&ds_name=&_ci_nbr=&qr_name=&reg=null%3Anull&_keyword=&_industry= US Census Bureau Fact Sheet for the Town of Manlius
 USGS Feature Data for the Town of Manlius
 Manlius history/genealogy
 Manlius Historical Society

 
Syracuse metropolitan area
Towns in Onondaga County, New York